Jade Simmons is an American classical concert pianist who was an independent presidential candidate in 2020.

Career
Simmons attended college at Northwestern University, and was crowned Miss Chicago and Miss Illinois in 1999. She was named first runner-up at the Miss America 2000 pageant.

In 2004, Simmons founded the Impulse Artists Series which was the 2009 winner of the Houston Press Best Non-Profit Arts Series. Simmons' first album was titled Revolutionary Rhythm, and was released in 2009. She released the single "Boss's Nova" in September 2012, and the Playing With Fire EP followed by a second full release on E1 titled #PaganiniProject in February 2013.

Politics
Simmons ran for President of the United States in 2020 as an independent. She ran on a centrist platform, attempting to appeal to what she defined as a "muted middle" of voters. Simmons had access to 15 electors. Her running mate was Claudeliah J. Roze.

References

External links 
 Jade Simmons official website
  Operation Restoration 2020 - Jade Simmon's Official Presidential Campaign website
 Impulse Artists Series

Texas classical music
Living people
Miss America 2000 delegates
Northwestern University alumni
Rice University alumni
Year of birth missing (living people)
Musicians from Charleston, South Carolina
21st-century American pianists
21st-century American women pianists
Candidates in the 2020 United States presidential election
20th-century American people
Beauty queen-politicians